Joy Connolly is an American scholar of classics and the president of the American Council of Learned Societies. She was previously interim president and provost of The Graduate Center, CUNY. She was formerly a professor of classics and the dean for humanities at New York University. Connolly's main research interests are Roman republicanism, rhetoric, civic discourse, classical reception, and the role that aesthetic experience plays in the formation of political judgement.

Education 
She is an alumna of and now serves on the board of Trustees for Middlesex School in Massachusetts.

Connolly graduated from Princeton University in 1991, and did her graduate work at the University of Pennsylvania, receiving her PhD in 1997.

Career
In 1997, she joined the classics faculty as assistant professor of classics at the University of Washington. In 2000, she was hired by the classics department at Stanford, and there taught both classics and political science classes. In 2004, she joined the faculty at NYU, where she was subsequently promoted to associate professor (2007) and professor (2014). In 2016 she was named provost, senior vice president and distinguished professor of classics at The Graduate Center of The City University of New York.

Connolly has published two monographs on Roman rhetoric and politics. The first, The State of Speech: Rhetoric and Political Thought in Ancient Rome, was published in 2007 by Princeton University Press; the second, The Life of Roman Republicanism, also published by Princeton and appeared in 2014.

She has published in classics and politics journals, and also contributes articles to Times Literary Supplement, The Nation, The Women's Review of Books, and the New York Times Book Review.

Connolly has served on the board of directors of the Society of Classical Studies and is currently a member of the Advanced Seminar in Classics and Ancient Near Eastern Studies sponsored by the Venice International University.

References

Graduate Center, CUNY
New York University faculty
Classics educators
Living people
1970 births
American classical scholars
Graduate Center, CUNY faculty
Princeton University alumni
Presidents of the American Council of Learned Societies